{{DISPLAYTITLE:C26H26N2O3}}
The molecular formula C26H26N2O3 may refer to:

 JWH-198, a drug which acts as a cannabinoid receptor agonist
 Naltrindole, a delta opioid receptor antagonist

Molecular formulas